Krista Fischer (born 5 August 1970) is an Estonian biostatistician whose research concerns body mass, genetic variability, and their association with diseases. She is a professor of mathematical statistics in the Institute of Mathematics and Statistics at the University of Tartu, where she is also an associate professor in the Institute of Genomics.

Education and career
Fischer was an undergraduate at the University of Tartu, specializing in mathematics and statistics, from 1988 to 1992. After earning a master's degree in mathematical statistics at Limburg University in Belgium in 1994, she returned to Tartu for doctoral study, completing her Ph.D. in 1999.

She was a postdoctoral researcher at Ghent University in Belgium, and became an associate professor of public health at the University of Tartu in 2001, becoming a senior lecturer there in 2006. She worked as a senior researcher at the Estonian Genome Center at the University of Tartu from 2010 to 2018, when she became a professor of mathematical statistics. In 2021 she added a second affiliation with the Institute of Genomics.

Recognition
In 2020, Fischer was elected to the Estonian Academy of Sciences.

References

External links

1970 births
Living people
Estonian statisticians
Women statisticians
Biostatisticians
University of Tartu alumni
Academic staff of the University of Tartu